Framingham Earl is a small village and civil parish in the English county of Norfolk.

History
Framingham Earl's name is of Anglo-Saxon origin and derives from the Old English for the village or homestead of Fram's people. The addition of 'Earl' was added due to the fact the village was traditionally part of the estates of the Earl of Norfolk.

Framingham Earl has been identified as the site of possible Roman settlement due to the discovery of coins, pottery, tiles and bricks during an excavation of a new gas pipeline in 1992.

In the Domesday Book, Framingham Earl is listed alongside Framingham Pigot as a settlement of 61 households in the hundred of Henstead. In 1086, the villages were divided between the East Anglian estates of King William I, Bishop Odo of Bayeux, Roger Bigod and Godric the Steward.

Geography
According to the 2011 Census, Framingham Earl has a population of 871 residents living in 374 households.

Framingham Earl falls within the constituency of South Norfolk and is represented at Parliament by Richard Bacon MP of the Conservative Party. For the purposes of local government, the parish falls within the district of South Norfolk.

St. Andrew's Church
Framingham Earl's parish church is dedicated to Saint Andrew and is one of Norfolk's 124 remaining Anglo-Saxon round-tower churches. The church tower dates from the Eleventh Century with the chancel being an earlier survival, the interior features rare surviving Medieval stained-glass depicting Saint Margaret and Saint Catherine.

Amenities
Framingham Earl High School is located within the village and operates as part of the Sapientia Education Trust. The school has a student body of around 800 and was rated as a 'Good' school in 2014 by Ofsted, a decision which was upheld in 2022. The school shares its site with a Sports Centre which opened in 2006 and offers exercise classes and sports to the local community. The centre is currently under the management of South Norfolk Council.

Notable Residents
 W. G. Sebald (1944-2001)- German writer and academic, buried in St. Andrew's Churchyard

War Memorial
Framingham Earl's war memorial takes the form of a marble plaque with a carved wooden border, located inside St. Thomas' Church. The memorial lists the following names for the First World War:
 L-Cpl. Henry Meadows (d.1916), 8th Bn., Royal Norfolk Regiment
 Pvt. F. Norman Watkinson (1897-1917), 9th Bn., Royal Norfolk Regt.
 James Clare
 William Smith

References

External links 

Parish Council website
St Andrew's on the European Round Tower Churches Website
Framingham Earl High School
Friends of St Andrew's Church

Villages in Norfolk
South Norfolk
Civil parishes in Norfolk